Frederica Murray, Countess of Mansfield (born Frederica Markham; 1774 – 29 April 1860), formerly Frederica Markham, was the wife of David William Murray, 3rd Earl of Mansfield.

Frederica was one of the seven daughters of William Markham, Archbishop of York, and his wife, the former Sarah Goddard. She also had six brothers, one of whom was Admiral John Markham. Another, George, was Dean of York.

In 1796 Murray succeeded his father, David Murray, 2nd Earl of Mansfield, as Earl of Mansfield; he inherited Kenwood House in Camden, London. The family also had homes in Scotland and Ireland. The following year, on 16 September 1797, he married Frederica.

They had nine children:

 Lady Frederica Louisa Murray (1800–1823), who married James Hamilton Stanhope and had children
 Lady Elizabeth Anne Murray (1803–1880), unmarried 
 Lady Caroline Murray (1805–1873), who became Lady of the Bedchamber to Princess Mary, Duchess of Gloucester and Edinburgh
 William David (1806–1898), who succeeded as 4th Earl of Mansfield, married Louisa Ellison, and had children
 Lady Georgina Catherine Murray (1807–1871)
 Honourable Charles John Murray (1810–1851), who married Frances Elizabeth, daughter of Thomas Anson, 1st Viscount Anson, and had children 
 Honourable David Henry Murray (1811–1862), a captain in the Scots Fusilier Guards, who married Margaret Grant, Lady Gray, and had no children
 Lady Cecilia Sarah Murray (1814–1830)
 Lady Emily Murray (1816–1902), who married Francis Seymour, later 5th Marquess of Hertford, and had children

The countess's father, the Archbishop of York, died in 1807. The countess is thought to have been responsible for extensive works carried out on Kenwood House in the period 1813–1816, which necessitated a doubling of staff.

References

1774 births
1860 deaths
British countesses